Maternus was Archbishop of Milan from c. 316 to c. 328. He is honoured as a Saint in the Catholic Church and his feast day is on July 18.

Life
Almost nothing is known about the life of Maternus. In 316, he was elected bishop of Milan by acclamation, both clergy and people insisting on having him for their Pastor; and reigned until about 328.

Maternus is believed to have discovered at Lodi Vecchio the remains of saints Nabor and Felix, who had been martyred during the reign of Emperor Diocletian in 303, and then relocated these relics to Milan, where a church known as the (Basilica Naboriana) was built in their honor. Maternus also completed the construction of the Basilica vetus, which had been started in 313 and was the first cathedral of Milan, located in the area now occupied by the present Cathedral of Milan.

He was beloved even by the Pagans; he encouraged and comforted his flock during the persecution under Diocletian.

Maternus died c. 328 on July 18, which was later set as his feast day by the Catholic Church. His body was also buried in the Basilica Naboriana, but in 1258 it was moved to the church of Saint Francis of Assisi which replaced it. On April 14, 1798, shortly before the demolition of the church, they were again moved to the Basilica of Sant'Ambrogio, located a few hundred meters to the south. They reside there today in an ancient sarcophagus within the right-hand nave of the church, along with the relics of Saints Nabor and Felix, as well as Saint Valeria.

Notes

Archbishops of Milan
320s deaths
4th-century Christian saints
Italian saints
Year of birth unknown